Zonnebloem (Dutch for sunflower) is a suburb in City of Cape Town metropolitan municipality in the Western Cape province of South Africa, previously part of District Six.

It was a farming estate until the early 19th century, when it became a suburb of Cape Town as the population and city boundaries grew. Zonnebloem became a home to freed slaves, merchants, labourers and immigrants. During apartheid, the area of District Six was declared a white-only area and the previous residents were forcefully evicted under the Group Areas Act of the apartheid regime.

The suburb hosts the District Six Campus of the Cape Peninsula University of Technology.

References

Suburbs of Cape Town